Fortnightly Corp. v. United Artists Television, Inc., 392 U.S. 390 (1968), was a United States Supreme Court case in which the Court held that receiving a television broadcast does not constitute a "performance" of a work. 

In 1968, the United States Copyright Office called this case "the most important American copyright case of the 1960s."

References

External links
 

1968 in United States case law
United States copyright case law
United States Supreme Court cases
United States Supreme Court cases of the Warren Court